Skeleton Key is an American rock band based in New York City, United States.  The band was conceived in 1994 by bassist and singer Erik Sanko, the only constant member of the band.  His intent was to create a sound "luxurious, yet affordable," using antique microphones, primitive guitars, and unconventional percussion.

History
The band’s first release was the Human Pin Cushion single with Dedicated Records.  In 1996 the band released an eponymous EP on Motel Records that Rolling Stone said "shows how pop culture and high culture can bring everyone to the same place."

The following year saw the band release their first full-length album, Fantastic Spikes Through Balloon, on Capitol Records.  The album was nominated for a Grammy Award in 1998 for its Stefan Sagmeister-designed artwork, which featured holes punched through the booklet of liner notes and, for promotional copies, a steel spike housed within the spine enclosure of the CD jewel case.

In early 2011 the band successfully raised over $9,000 on the online crowdfunding website Kickstarter, used to finish production of their next album.  Later that year, they signed with Arctic Rodeo Recordings and announced an upcoming release.  On March 7, 2012, a promotional video of the band in the studio was released via Visions Magazin.

Band members

Current
 Erik Sanko – Bass guitar, vocals
 Craig LeBlang – Guitar
 Benjamin Clapp – "Junk" percussion
 Bob Vaccarelli – Drum kit

Former
 Chris Maxwell – Guitar
 Rick Lee – "Junk" percussion
 Matthias Bossi – Drum kit
 Sean Sankey – Drum kit
 Nic Brown - Drums
 Tim Keiper – "Junk" percussion
 Steve Calhoon - Drum kit/Junk percussion

Discography
 Human Pin Cushion Single (1995, Dedicated Records)
 Skeleton Key EP (1996, Motel Records)
 Fantastic Spikes Through Balloon (1997, Capitol Records)
 An Ellipse (2001, Exquisite Corpse Records)
 Obtainium (2002, Ipecac Recordings)
 Live at Metro (2004, Re:Live)
 The Lyons Quintette EP (2005, Do Tell Records)
 Gravity is the Enemy (2012, Arctic Rodeo Recordings)

Awards
Independent Music Awards 2013: Gravity is the Enemy - Best Eclectic Album

References

External links
Official Site
The Unofficial Site
SK on MySpace

Alternative rock groups from New York (state)
American industrial rock musical groups
American experimental rock groups
Musical groups from New York City
Ipecac Recordings artists